Bala Fidarreh (also Romanized as Bālā Fīdarreh; also known as Bālā Fedreh and Bālā Fūdarreh) is a village in Layl Rural District, in the Central District of Lahijan County, Gilan Province, Iran. At the 2006 census, its population was 257, in 67 families.

References 

Populated places in Lahijan County